A process design kit (PDK) is a set of files used within the semiconductor industry to model a fabrication process for the design tools used to design an integrated circuit. The PDK is created by the foundry defining a certain technology variation for their processes. It is then passed to their customers to use in the design process. The customers may enhance the PDK, tailoring it to their specific design styles and markets. The designers use the PDK to design, simulate, draw and verify the design before handing the design back to the foundry to produce chips. The data in the PDK is specific to the foundry's process variation and is chosen early in the design process, influenced by the market requirements for the chip. An accurate PDK will increase the chances of first-pass successful silicon.

Description 
Different tools in the design flow have different input formats for the PDK data. The PDK engineers have to decide which tools they will support in the design flows and create the libraries and rule sets which support those flows. 

A typical PDK contains:

 A primitive device library
 Symbols
 Device parameters
 PCells
 Verification decks
 Design Rule Checking
 Layout Versus Schematic
 Antenna and Electrical rule check
 Physical Extraction
 Technology data
 Layers, layer names, layer/purpose pairs
 Colors, fills and display attributes
 Process constraints
 Electrical rules
 Rule files
 LEF
 Tool dependent rule formats
 Simulation models of primitive devices (SPICE or SPICE derivatives)
 Transistors (typically SPICE)
 Capacitors
 Resistors
 Inductors
 Design Rule Manual
 A user friendly representation of the process requirements
A PDK may also include standard cell libraries from the foundry, a library vendor or developed internally
 LEF format of abstracted layout data
 Symbols
 Library (.lib) files
 GDSII layout data

References

Further reading 
 Yu Cao, "Predictive process design kits", ch. 8 in, Predictive Technology Model for Robust Nanoelectronic Design, Springer Science & Business Media, 2011 .
 Lukas Chrostowski, Michael Hochberg, "Process design kit (PDK)", section 10.1 in, Silicon Photonics Design, Cambridge University Press, 2015 .
 Michael Liehr et al., "Silicon photonics integrated circuit process design kit", section 4.8 in, Alan Willner (ed), Optical Fiber Telecommunications, vol. 11, Elsevier, 2019 .
 Ian Robertson, Nutapong Somjit, Mitchai Chongcheawchamnan, "Process design kits for RFIC and MMIC design", section 17.8.1 in, Microwave and Millimetre-Wave Design for Wireless Communications, John Wiley & Sons, 2016 .

Semiconductor device fabrication